Ann Cooper or Anne Cooper may refer to:

Fictional characters
 Anne Cooper, in Gidget and Gidget (TV series)
 Anne Cooper, in Desperate Remedies (film)

People, first and last
 Ann Cooper (journalist), foreign correspondent and Committee to Protect Journalists executive director
 Anne Cooper (camogie) in Gael Linn Cup 1988 FF 12 (Dublin)
 Anna J. Cooper (1858–1964), African-American author, academic and educator
 Ann Nixon Cooper (1902–2009), African-American representative
 Ann Westine Cooper, managed the .us ccTLD's policies

People, first and middle
 Ann Cooper Hewitt, daughter of Peter Cooper Hewitt, sterilized by her mother, to take her daughter's inheritance
 Ann Cooper Whitall (1716–1797), American Quaker

People, middle and middle
 Jane Ann Cooper Bennett, known as Jane Bennett, Australian painter

People, middle and last
 Rachel Ann Cooper (born 1954), American performing arts presenter known as Rachel Cooper
 Linda Ann Cooper, known as Linda Cooper, New Zealand politician
 Sally Ann Cooper, known as Sally Cooper, Australian cricket player
 Jacqueline Anne Cooper, known as Jacki Cooper, Australian jazz singer
 Lisa Ann Cooper, ex-wife of Chris Sarandon
 Sara Ann Cooper, Missouri Miss America 1958 contestant